Abramovo is the name of several rural localities in Russia:
Abramovo, Arzamassky District, Nizhny Novgorod Oblast, a selo in Arzamassky District of Nizhny Novgorod Oblast
Abramovo, Dorogobuzhsky District, Smolensk Oblast, a village in Mikhailovskoye Settlement of Dorogobuzhsky District of Smolensk Oblast; 
Abramovo, Krasnooktyabrsky District, Nizhny Novgorod Oblast, a village in Krasnooktyabrsky District of Nizhny Novgorod Oblast
Abramovo, Leningrad Oblast, a village in Tikhvinsky District of Leningrad Oblast
Abramovo, Moscow Oblast, a village in Sergiyevo-Posadsky District of Moscow Oblast
Abramovo, Novosibirsk Oblast, a selo in Kuybyshevsky District, Novosibirsk Oblast
Abramovo, Perm Krai, a village in Kosinsky District of Perm Krai
Abramovo, Rudnyansky District, Smolensk Oblast, a village in Ponizovsky Settlement of Rudnyansky District of Smolensk Oblast; 
Abramovo, Sverdlovsk Oblast, a selo in Sysertsky District of Sverdlovsk Oblast
Abramovo, Tyomkinsky District, Smolensk Oblast, a village in Medvedevskoye Settlement of Tyomkinsky District of Smolensk Oblast; 
Abramovo, Vladimir Oblast, a village in Melenkovsky District of the Vladimir Oblast
Abramovo, Vologda Oblast, a village in of Vologodsky District of Vologda Oblast